Tetanops flavescens is a species of picture-winged fly in the genus Tetanops of the family Ulidiidae.

References

flavescens